Konarski (feminine: Konarska, plural: Konarscy) is a Polish surname. The name is thought to be an occupational name, meaning "groom", or it may come from any number of places named Konary, which also comes from the Polish word for groom. The first syllable "koń" means horse.

People
 Dawid Konarski (born 1989), Polish volleyball player
 Feliks Konarski (1907-1991), a Polish poet, songwriter, and cabaret performer
 Janina Konarska, Polish artist
 Stanisław Konarski (1700-1773), a Polish educational reformer
 Szymon Konarski (1808-1839), a Polish revolutionary

Institutions
Konarski Secondary School in Rzeszów, one of the oldest secondary schools in Poland

Heraldry
The Konarski name is associated with the following coats of arms:
 Adbank
 Gryf
 Lewart
 Nowina
 Ossorya
 Rola
 Topór

Notes

Polish-language surnames